Cornelius "Con" Sheehan (born 3 March 1989) is an Irish boxer from Clonmel, Ireland. As an amateur the became the youngest ever Irish Elite Heavyweight champion going on to win a total of a six Irish Elite titles, four at heavyweight and two at super heavyweight. He also represented the Leipzig Leopards in the World Series of Boxing and won a gold and a silver medal for Ireland in two consecutive years at the European Union Amateur Boxing Championships. Since turning professional he is undefeated in six contests.

Amateur career
Sheehan boxed for Clonmel Boxing Club, where he was trained by Martin Fennessy. He debuted as a Senior boxer in the Heavyweight division before later moving to Super Heavyweight. His first Irish Elite title came in 2008 at Heavyweight with a points victory over Tommy Sheehan in the final. Sheehan would go on to six Irish Elite titles.

In the 2008 European Union Amateur Boxing Championships in Cetniewo, Poland, competed at Heavyweight earning victories over Stephen Simmons from Scotland (15:6) in the Quarter Finals and Germany's Vahagn Sahakyan (10:7) in the semis.  In the final he faced the favoured Greek boxer Helias Pavlidis, against whom he lost on points (12:29) earning a silver medal.

The following year European Union Championships took place in Odense, Denmark, and Sheehan competed again in the Heavyweight division. In the semi finals he beat England's Warren Baister in the Semi Finals and beat Spain's Juan Oliva Aleman (13:2) in the finals to earn a gold medal.

In his last national elite championships, Sheehan earned a points victories over Jason Barrons, Niall Kennedy and clubmate Dean Gardiner to clinch the 2014 Irish Super Heavyweight title.

Professional career
In 2015, Sheehan moved to the USA to train under Virgil Hunter at King’s Boxing Gym in Oakland, California. Sheehan made his professional debut on 19 January 2016 against Jonathan Rice in Club Nokia, Los Angeles, California, United States.

Sheehan went on to have a further five fights in the United Kingdom chalking up a record of 6-0. He has been inactive since 2017.

Professional boxing record

| style="text-align:center;" colspan="8"|6 Wins (1 Knockouts), 0 Losses, 0 Draw
|-  style="text-align:center; background:#e3e3e3;"
|  style="border-style:none none solid solid; "|Res.
|  style="border-style:none none solid solid; "|Record
|  style="border-style:none none solid solid; "|Opponent
|  style="border-style:none none solid solid; "|Type
|  style="border-style:none none solid solid; "|Rd., Time
|  style="border-style:none none solid solid; "|Date
|  style="border-style:none none solid solid; "|Location
|  style="border-style:none none solid solid; "|Notes
|- align=center
|Win
|6–0
|align=left| Tomas Mrazek
|
|8
|24 June 2017
|align=left|
|
|- align=center
|Win
|5–0
|align=left| Ferenc Zsalek
|
|8
|10 Mar 2017
|align=left|
|
|- align=center
|Win
|4–0
|align=left| Kamil Sokolowski
|
|8
|5 Nov 2016
|align=left|
|
|- align=center
|Win
|3–0
|align=left| Radek Varak
|
|1 (8), 
|1 Oct 2016
|align=left|
|
|- align=center
|Win
|2–0
|align=left| Igor Mihaljevic
|
|4
|24 Sep 2016
|align=left|
|
|- align=center
|Win
|1–0
|align=left| Jonathan Rice
|
|4
|19 Jan 2016
|align=left|
|align=left|

References

External links
 

1989 births
Heavyweight boxers
Living people
People from County Tipperary
People from Clonmel
Irish male boxers